Carthaginian tombstones are Punic language-inscribed tombstones excavated from the city of Carthage over the last 200 years. The first such discoveries were published by Jean Emile Humbert in 1817, Hendrik Arent Hamaker in 1828 and Christian Tuxen Falbe in 1833.

The steles were first published together in the Corpus Inscriptionum Semiticarum; the first focused collection was published by Jean Ferron in 1976. Ferron identified four types of funerary steles:
 Type I: Statues (type I Α, Β or C depending on whether it is a "quasi ronde-bosse", a "half-relief" or a "Herma-type" )
 Type II: Bas-reliefs (Type II 1, where the figure stands out in an arc of a circle, and II 2, where it protrudes in a flattened relief)
 Type III: niche monuments or naiskos (type III 1, with a rectangular or trapezoidal niche, and III 2, niche with triangular top)
 Type IV: Engraved steles (extremely rare).

The oldest funerary stelae belong to Type III and date back to the 5th century BCE, becoming widespread at the end of the 4th century BCE. Bas-reliefs and statues appeared later.

Gallery

Bibliography

Primary sources
 Jean Emile Humbert, Notice sur quatre cippes sépulcraux et deux fragments, découverts en 1817, sur le sol de l'ancienne Carthage.
 Hendrik Arent Hamaker (1828), Miscellanea Phoenicia
 Christian Tuxen Falbe, Recherches sur l'emplacement de Carthage
 Augustus Wollaston Franks (1860). On Recent Excavations at Carthage, and the Antiquities discovered there by the Rev. Nathan Davis. Archaeologia, 38(1), 202-236. doi:10.1017/S0261340900001387
 
 Charles Ernest Beulé, 1861, Fouilles à Carthage aux frais et sous la direction de M. Beulé
 
 Delattre, Alfred Louis (1902). Une épitaphe punique de Carthage. In: Comptes rendus des séances de l'Académie des Inscriptions et Belles-Lettres, 46e année, N. 5, 1902. pp. 522–523. DOI : https://doi.org/10.3406/crai.1902.17295
 Delattre, Alfred Louis, Berger, Philippe. Épitaphes puniques et sarcophage de marbre. In: Comptes rendus des séances de l'Académie des Inscriptions et Belles-Lettres, 48e année, N. 5, 1904. pp. 505–512. DOI : https://doi.org/10.3406/crai.1904.19929

Secondary sources
 Mendleson, Carole, Images & symbols: On Punic stelae from the tophet at Carthage, Archaeology & history in Lebanon. 2001, Num 13, pp 45–50
 Bénichou-Safar Hélène (1982), Chapitre III. LES INSCRIPTIONS FUNÉRAIRES, Les tombes puniques de Carthage. Topographie, structures, inscriptions et rites funéraires. Paris : Éditions du Centre National de la Recherche Scientifique, 452 p. (Études d'antiquités africaines)
 
 
 Stéphane Gsell, 1920–30, Histoire ancienne de l'Afrique du Nord, Tome 4, Chapitre IV, Les Pratiques Funéraires
 Lopez and Amadasi, The Epigraphy of the Tophet, 2013, In book: The Tophet in the Phoenician Mediterranean (= Studi Epigrafici e Linguistici sul Vicino Oriente antico 29-30, 2012-13) (pp.pp. 159-192)Chapter: The Epigraphy of the TophetPublisher: Essedue Edizioni, VeronaEditors: Paolo Xella

References

Carthage
Punic inscriptions